The Alien is the eighth book in the Animorphs series, written by K. A. Applegate. It is the first book narrated by Ax.

Plot
After destroying both the Kandrona and the Veleek, the Animorphs assumed that they would see people freeing themselves of the Yeerks. They are disappointed until the day they take Ax to the cinema. A man's Yeerk is seen dying publicly. However, a Controller-policeman kills the free man.

The Animorphs take Ax to the school as Philip, Jake's cousin, and a Yeerk who controlled one of Jake's teachers is seen dying as well. Chapman appears, orders the students to leave, and kills the non-Controller teacher.

Jake and the other Animorphs become very angry with Ax, since Ax knew the Yeerks would kill abandoned hosts (along with much more Andalite knowledge), but would not share with the humans. Innocent people are dying as a result of their actions. Ax retorts that they would not have destroyed the Kandrona had they known the consequences, to which Jake replies that Ax still has a lot to learn about humans.

The next day, he meets with Marco to go to a bookshop in hopes that Ax would trust them if they trusted him. However, Marco forgets the money they collected for him to buy a book at home, so he and Ax go to Marco's house to pick it up. While Ax waits for Marco in the living room, he plays what he thinks is a game on Marco's father's computer.

It turns out that he had developed a new system for a radio telescope that was very advanced. With Tobias's help, Ax goes to the observatory and he uses it to communicate with his home world. There, an Andalite made him assume all the responsibility for Elfangor's actions and is consequently forgiven. While Ax is speaking with his father, he is interrupted by a Controller whose loved one had died when Visser Three chose to sacrifice her after the Kandrona's destruction. To avenge her, he tells Ax where and when Visser Three feeds his Andalite body.

Ax decides to go alone and not tell the others about the information he received. He poisons Visser Three by morphing into a rattlesnake and biting him. As Ax is about to die, the Animorphs arrive to save him. With his host body having been poisoned, the Yeerk Visser Three leaves the body. However, Ax is unable to kill a fellow Andalite despite being asked to do so, so Visser Three's host Alloran-Semitur-Corrass asks him to tell his family that he is still alive and that he has not lost hope.

Ax returns to the observatory, calls his home planet, and delivers Alloran's message. He announces Earth is his new home, and that he will tell the Animorphs everything.

Ax tells the Animorphs that Seerow was the first Andalite to go to the Yeerk home planet, and that he felt sorry for the Yeerks and gave them the technology they later used to conquer the world. Contrary to what Ax had expected, the others did not blame the Andalites for their problem. They recognized the good action and how to learn from mistakes,  and told him that humans and Andalites share the same goal: freedom.

Inconsistencies

Tobias talks to Ax (in human morph) and the other Animorphs using thought-speak. However, Ax doesn't respond, saying that since he was in human morph he is limited to human speech. This is an inconsistency, as Ax's human morph is still a morph, and he should still be able to use thought-speak. This is later corrected in later novels, such as The Proposal, where Ax (in human morph) communicates with the others using thought-speak.

Morphs

Re-release
Scholastic re-released this book in September 2012, but only on the Amazon Kindle and other eBook services.

References
Christine Hepperman, "Invasion of the Anomorphs," The Horn Book Magazine, Boston, Vol. 74, No. 1,  (Jan/Feb 1998): 53-56.

External links
 

Animorphs books
1997 American novels
1997 science fiction novels
American science fiction novels
Fiction portraying humans as aliens
Novels about extraterrestrial life